Apollo Tyres Limited is an Indian Multinational tyre manufacturing company headquartered in Gurugram, Haryana. It was incorporated in 1972, and its first plant was commissioned in Perambra in  Chalakudy, Kerala (India). The company now has five manufacturing units in India, one in Netherlands  and one in Hungary. It has a network of nearly 5,000 dealerships in India, of which over 2,500 are exclusive outlets.

The company generates 69% of its revenues from India, 26% from Europe and 5% from other countries.

Apollo announced its entry into the two-wheeler tyre segment with contract manufacturing in March 2016.

The company's second plant in Europe, was inaugurated by the Hungarian Prime Minister, Viktor Orban, in April 2017. Shares of Apollo Tyres Ltd. rose to their highest in little over two years in February, 2021 trading at 253.10.

History 
 
Apollo Tyres Ltd. was incorporated on 28 September 1972 in India as a Public Limited Company and obtained certificate of Commencement of Business on 24 October 1972.  The company was promoted by Bharat Steel Tubes, Ltd., Raunaq International Pvt. Ltd., Raunaq & Co. Pvt. Ltd., Raunaq Singh, Mathew T. Marattukalam and Jacob Thomas. In 1975, the company made its Initial public offer of equity shares and its first manufacturing facility was commissioned in Perambra Plant, Thrissur, Kerala, India in 1977, followed by its 2nd plant at Limda, Gujarat, India in 1991. The company acquired Premier Tyres Limited- PTL in 1995, which became its 3rd plant at Kalamassery, Kerala, India. In 2008, it started a new plant at Chennai, Tamil Nadu, India. A year later in 2009, the company acquired the Netherlands-based tyre maker Vredestein Banden B.V. (VBBV) for an undisclosed sum

The company focused on the production of truck tyres in India and introduced its first truck tyre, Rajdhani in India. The company expanded its operation across India and in 1996, it expanded operations outside India by acquiring Dunlop's Africa operations. In 2013, it disposed of the Dunlop brand in Africa along with most of the South African operation in a sale to Sumitomo Rubber Industries of Japan. The very same year, it started its Global R&D Centre, Europe in Enschede, the Netharlands.

In 2015, Apollo Tyres bought Germany's Reifencom tyre distributor for €45.6 million. It shifted its corporate office for Europe region to Amsterdam from Enschede, the Netherlands and opened a Global R&D Centre, Asia in Chennai, India a few months later.

In 2016, the company signed an MoU with the Government of Andhra Pradesh to set up a new factory in the state. In 2017, it inaugurated its plant in Hungary. On 9 January 2018, the Chief Minister of Andhra Pradesh, N Chandrababu Naidu laid the foundation stone for Apollo Tyres' ₹1,800-crore tyre factory in Andhra Pradesh. The plant will come up over a 200-acre site in Chinnapanduru village near Sri City in Tirupati district and produce passenger car radial (PCR) tyres with an initial capacity of 55 lakh (5.5 million) tyres per year and also truck bus radial (TBR) tyres and will serve both domestic and export markets.

Corporate Structure and Leadership 
Apollo Tyres is structured in the following units:
 Asia Pacific, Middle East and Africa (APMEA)
 Satish Sharma, President
 Europe 
 Benoit Rivallant, President 
Board of Directors 
 Onkar Kanwar, Chairman & Managing Director
Neeraj Kanwar, Vice Chairman and Managing Director
 Akshay Chudasama
 Dr. S Narayan
 Francesco Gori 
 General Bikram Singh (Retd.) 
 Nimesh N Kampani 
 Pallavi Shroff
 Robert Steinmetz
 Sunam Sarkar
 Vikram S Mehta 
 Vinod Rai
Anjali Bansal
Dr M Beena
 Seema Thapar

European Operations 

Apollo Tyres currently sells Apollo and Vredestein (or Maloya) branded tyres in Europe. The company currently operates two tyre factories in Europe; in the Netherlands and in Hungary. The Enschede plant was acquired from Vredestein, the newly buit facility southeasterly from Gyöngyöshalász was inaugurated for production on 7 April 2017.

Anti competition practices 
In April 2022, the Competition Commission of India raided the headquarters of Apollo Tyres along with other tyre companies like CEAT, MRF (Madras Rubber Factory) and Continental Tyre at multiple locations. Earlier in February the anti trust watch dog had released a statement about fining these tyre companies a total of 1,788 crores (of which Apollo Tyres fined 425.53 cr.) for sharing price sensitive information among themselves to manage their cartelization of tyre prices for supplies to the public transport corporation of Haryana state. Earlier the All India Tyre Dealers Federation had complained to the Ministry of Corporate Affairs about this cartelization of these companies to increase the tyre prices. The ministry had then referred the case to the CCI.

References

External links 
 
 Dunlop Tyres South Africa website
 Apollo Tyres Acquires Vredestein Banden BV

Economy of Thrissur district
Manufacturing companies based in Gurgaon
Manufacturing companies established in 1972
Tyre manufacturers of India
Automotive companies of India
Indian brands
1972 establishments in Haryana
Indian companies established in 1972
Companies listed on the National Stock Exchange of India
Companies listed on the Bombay Stock Exchange